Jonathan Stanley Loáisiga Estrada (pronounced "loh-AYE-see-gah", born November 2, 1994) is a Nicaraguan professional baseball pitcher for the New York Yankees of Major League Baseball (MLB). He made his MLB debut in 2018.

Career

San Francisco Giants
Loáisiga signed with the San Francisco Giants as an international free agent in September 2012. He made his professional debut in 2013 with the DSL Giants and spent the whole season there, posting an 8–1 win–loss record with a 2.75 earned run average (ERA) and 1.11 WHIP in 13 games started. He did not pitch in 2014 and 2015 due to injuries, and the Giants released him in May 2015.

New York Yankees
He signed with the New York Yankees in February 2016. He began the season with the Charleston RiverDogs, and after pitching one game, he suffered an injury which required Tommy John surgery. The Yankees added him to their 40-man roster after the season. He returned in 2017 and pitched for both the GCL Yankees and Staten Island Yankees, pitching to a combined 1–1 record and 1.38 ERA in 11 starts.

Loáisiga began the 2018 season with the Tampa Yankees of the Class A-Advanced Florida State League, and earned a promotion to the Trenton Thunder of the Class AA Eastern League after starting the season with 3–0 record with 1.35 ERA over four starts. In Trenton, he made six starts, compiling a 4.32 ERA, however impressed by striking out 32 batters in 25 innings of work. After Yankees starter Masahiro Tanaka was injured, Loáisiga was called up to the majors, skipping the Class AAA level. He made his major league debut on June 15, 2018, during which he pitched five scoreless innings, and earned the win. He was also the first Nicaraguan to play for the Yankees. He made four starts for the Yankees, pitching to a 3.00 ERA, and was optioned to the Scranton/Wilkes-Barre RailRiders of the Class AAA International League on July 2. He was recalled to the Yankees on September 2 after roster expansion. In total he pitched  innings for the Yankees in 2018. He followed it up in 2019 with  innings across 15 appearances for the Yankees.

In 2020, Loáisiga broke camp with the Yankees, again serving as a swing man, starting occasionally and also coming out of the bullpen.

On April 24, 2021, Loáisiga recorded his first career save against the Cleveland Indians. Two months later on June 25, Loáisiga became the first relief pitcher in Yankees history to strike out four batters in one inning, striking out Michael Chavis, Alex Verdugo, J. D. Martinez, and Xander Bogaerts of the Boston Red Sox in the seventh inning.

In July 2021, Loáisiga, along with teammates Nestor Cortes, and Wandy Peralta tested positive for COVID-19, causing the Yankees to put him on the COVID-19 injured list and the MLB to postpone the game against the Boston Red Sox to the start of the second half of the season.

Loáisiga finished the 2021 season with 18 holds, a 2.17 ERA and 69 strikeouts in  innings.

In 2022 he was 2-3 with a 4.13 ERA.

International career
Loáisiga played for the Nicaraguan national baseball team in the 2017 World Baseball Classic Qualifier.

Personal life
His father Stanley Loáisiga played in the Montreal Expos minor league system and his grandfather was an accomplished professional pitcher in Nicaragua. His brother Mike signed with the Los Angeles Dodgers at 17 and played in the team's minor leagues until 2018. Growing up, Jonathan idolized Dennis Martínez, a fellow Nicaraguan who won 245 games in the major leagues.

See also
List of Major League Baseball players from Nicaragua

References

External links

1994 births
Living people
Sportspeople from Managua
Major League Baseball players from Nicaragua
Nicaraguan expatriate baseball players in the United States
Major League Baseball pitchers
New York Yankees players
Dominican Summer League Giants players
Nicaraguan expatriate baseball players in the Dominican Republic
Charleston RiverDogs players
Gulf Coast Yankees players
Staten Island Yankees players
Tampa Tarpons players
Trenton Thunder players
Scranton/Wilkes-Barre RailRiders players
2023 World Baseball Classic players